Murray's Handbooks for Travellers were travel guide books published in London by John Murray beginning in 1836. The series covered tourist destinations in Europe and parts of Asia and northern Africa. According to scholar James Buzard, the Murray style "exemplified the exhaustive rational planning that was as much an ideal of the emerging tourist industry as it was of British commercial and industrial organization generally."  The guidebooks became popular enough to appear in works of fiction such as Charles Lever's Dodd Family Abroad. After 1915 the series continued as the Blue Guides and the familiar gold gilted red Murrays Handbooks published by John Murray London including the 
long running Handbook to India, Pakistan, Ceylon & Burma which concluded with the 21st edition in 1968 before changing from the original format of 1836 to a more modern paperback edition of 1975.

List of Murray's Handbooks by date of publication

1830s

1840s
  (Index)
 
 
 
 
 
 
  v.2 Finland and Russia

1850s

1860s

1870s
 
 
 
 
 
 
 
 
 
 
 
  (Includes guide to Madras City)

1880s
 
 
 
 
  Pt. 1

1890s
 
 
  Pt.1; Pt. 2
 
  (online at Open Library)

1900s
 
 
 
  + Index
  (Cover title: Murray's Handbook Ireland)

1910s
  via Hathi Trust. + (Index)

List of Murray's Handbooks by geographic coverage

Algeria
  Digitized version
  Pt. 1
 
 
  Pt. 1

Belgium

Egypt

France
 
 
  + Index

Germany
 
 
 
  + Index
 1871 ed. + Index
  + Index
  + Index
 
  + Index
 Google books version + Index

Great Britain

England
 
 1890 ed.

East Midlands region 
  + Index
 1874 ed.
 Handbook for Northamptonshire and Rutland (2nd ed.), London, Edwards Stanford, 1901.

East of England region 
 
  + Index

London region 
 
 
 
 
  + index

North West England region

South East England region 
 
1868 (3rd) edition

 
 
 1882 ed.

South West England region 
 
 . Index
  + Index
  + Index

West Midlands region 
 
  + Index

Yorkshire and the Humber region 
  + Index
  + Index

Scotland

Wales

Greece
 
  + Index
 
 
  Pt. 1

India
 
  (Includes guide to Madras City)
  + Index
  + Index
 
 
  + Index

Ireland
  + Index
  + Index  (Cover title: Murray's Handbook Ireland)

Italy 
 
 
 
 
 
 
 
 
  + Index

Japan
 
 
 
 
  + index

Portugal
 
 
  + Index

Russia
 . v.2: Finland and Russia
 
  + Index

Scandinavia
 
 
 
  + Index
 1892 ed.

Spain 
 
  + Index
Pt.1 (Andalucia, Ronda and Granada, Murcia, Valencia, and Catalonia)
Pt. 2 (Estremadura, Leon, Gallicia, the Asturias, the Castiles (Old and New), the Basque Provinces, Arragon, and Navarre)
 . Pt. 2 + Index
  + Index
 v.1 (through p.298)
 v.2
  + Index

Switzerland

Syria
 . Pt. 1; Pt. 2 (p. 291-652); index
 . + Index

Turkey
 
  + Index
 . (Index).
  Pt. 1
  Pt.1; Pt. 2
 . (Index).
 1895 ed. in Google books

References

Further reading
 
 
 

Travel guide books
Series of books
Publications established in 1836
John Murray (publishing house) books
Tourism in Europe